James Daniel Forrest (December 18, 1897 – April 22, 1977) was an American Negro league catcher between 1919 and 1921.

A native of Orangeburg, South Carolina, Forrest played for the Lincoln Giants in 1919 and again in 1921. In his 11 recorded games, he posted 11 hits and five RBI in 44 plate appearances. Forrest died in 1977 at age 79.

References

External links
Baseball statistics and player information from Baseball-Reference Black Baseball Stats and Seamheads

1897 births
1977 deaths
Place of death missing
Lincoln Giants players
Baseball catchers
Baseball players from South Carolina
People from Orangeburg, South Carolina
20th-century African-American sportspeople